Philippe Chanlot (born 8 October 1967) is a former professional footballer. He played as a striker.

External links
 

1967 births
Living people
Footballers from Orléans
French footballers
French people of Guadeloupean descent
Association football forwards
Lille OSC players
Olympique de Marseille players
FC Annecy players
FC Metz players
Louhans-Cuiseaux FC players
Toulouse FC players
Neuchâtel Xamax FCS players
Chamois Niortais F.C. players
FC Rouen players
Canet Roussillon FC players
Zhejiang Professional F.C. players
Ligue 1 players
Ligue 2 players
Expatriate footballers in China
French expatriate sportspeople in China
Wasquehal Football players
French expatriate footballers